Baraki is a commune belonging to Baraki District in Algiers Province in Northern Algeria.

Notable people

Suburbs of Algiers
Communes of Algiers Province
Cities in Algeria